Aaron Lewiss Martin (born 5 July 1991) is an English professional footballer who plays as a forward for Gateshead.

Career
Martin was born in Sheffield.

After playing youth football for Sheffield United and Barnsley, Martin played senior football for Staveley Miners Welfare, Worksop Parramore, Goole, Sheffield, Brighouse Town and Guiseley before signing for 
Harrogate Town in March 2020.

On 9 July 2022, Martin joined National League side Gateshead F.C. on a two-year deal following the clubs promotion the season before.

References

External links
 

1991 births
Living people
English footballers
Barnsley F.C. players
Sheffield United F.C. players
Staveley Miners Welfare F.C. players
Parramore Sports F.C. players
Goole A.F.C. players
Sheffield F.C. players
Brighouse Town F.C. players
Guiseley A.F.C. players
Harrogate Town A.F.C. players
FC Halifax Town players
Gateshead F.C. players
English Football League players
Association football forwards
Footballers from Sheffield